The 1983 World Endurance Championship was the 31st season of FIA World Sportscar Championship auto racing series.  It featured the two world championships and two cups for drivers and manufacturers which was contested by Group C Sports Cars, Group C Junior Sports Cars and Group B GT Cars in a seven race events which ran from 10 April to 10 December 1983. The World Endurance Championship for Drivers was won by Jacky Ickx while the World Endurance Championship for Manufacturers was won by Porsche.  The Group C Junior Cup was won by Ginnini Alba and the Grand Touring Cup by Porsche.

The world championship was held in conjunction with the 1983 European Endurance Championship, sharing five races events in Europe before the series departed internationally.  As such, many drivers and teams competed in both championships.

Schedule
The first five events were shared with the European Endurance Championship. The Monza round was shared with the Italian Championship Group 6, although their race lasted only 14 laps and the cars did not complete the full endurance race distance.

Entries

Group C

Group C Junior

Group B
The Nürburgring round allowed additional Group B entries meeting the under  regulations to compete but they were not eligible for championship points and are therefore not listed here.

Results and standings

Race results

In order to be classified for points, a team had to complete 90% of the winner's distance. Further, drivers were required to complete at least 30% of their car's total race distance to qualify for championship points.  Group C Junior and Group B drivers earned extra championship points for any finish within the overall top ten positions.

World Endurance Championship for Drivers

Makes' championships
To denote a make, it is identified as an engine manufacturer-chassis manufacturer.  Only the best result from each make earned championship points while the five best results from each make's tally were counted.  Points not counted are marked with parenthesis.

World Endurance Championship for Makes
The World Endurance Championship for Makes was open to Group C cars only.  Group C Junior and Group B had their own championships.

Group C Junior Cup

Grand Touring Cup

References

External links
 1983 World Endurance Championship race results at wsrp.ic.cz
 1983 European Endurance Championship race results at wsrp.ic.cz
 Results, images and race programs at www.racingsportscars.com
 World Sportscar Championship at www.classicscars.com
 World Sports Car Championship at www.dlg.speedfreaks.org

 
World Sportscar Championship seasons
Sports